Blanc Chun-Pong Wan  (Chinese: 尹俊邦) is a Hong Kong born classical pianist and writer.

Biography
Blanc Wan is a pianist, musicologist and educator. His recitals and radio appearances have included over a hundred performances across Europe, Asia, USA and throughout the United Kingdom. He is a governor of the Royal Northern College of Music. Blanc Wan holds fellowships from the Royal Society of Arts, Royal Schools of Music, London College of Music, and Trinity College of Music. He was elected as a Young Steinway Artist in 2011.

Blanc Wan studied the piano at the Royal Northern College of Music, and earned his master's degree at University of Oxford.

Wan has broadcast on radio networks such as RTHK and other overseas services, and has given recitals throughout Europe and Asia. As the Editor-in-Chief of The Pianist magazine, he has published interviews with some of the world's pianists.

Publications
Selected articles
"What is Practice? Am I practicing?" The Pianist Magazine No. 1 (Hong Kong: 2012), 25-26.
"Performance Preparation" The Pianist Magazine No. 2 (Hong Kong: 2012), 14-17.
"Performing from Memory" The Pianist Magazine No. 3 (Hong Kong: 2012), 30-33.
"Does Piano Examination suit you or your pupil?" The Pianist Magazine No. 4 (Hong Kong: 2012), 22-23.
"Movement and Gestures" The Pianist Magazine No. 5 (Hong Kong: 2013), 22-23.
"Hand Position & Legato Playing" The Pianist Magazine No. 6 (Hong Kong: 2013), 20-23.
"Piano Fingering" The Pianist Magazine No. 7 (Hong Kong: 2013), 20-23.
"The Mind and The Body - Stage Presence of a Concert Pianist" The Pianist Magazine No. 8 (Hong Kong: 2013), 14-15.
"Performing with Black and White: The Conception of Right or Wrong" The Pianist Magazine No. 9 (Hong Kong: 2014), 24-25.
"Playing Octaves" The Pianist Magazine No. 10 (Hong Kong: 2014), 19-21.
"Music Training: Quantity and Quality" The Pianist Magazine No. 11 (Hong Kong: 2014), 8-9.
"Acton of the Wrist" The Pianist Magazine No. 12 (Hong Kong: 2014), 15-17.
"Training the weak fingers" The Pianist Magazine No. 13 (Hong Kong: 2015), 14-17.

References

External links
 Official Website
 University of Oxford
 Steinway & Sons

Living people
Hong Kong pianists
Alumni of the Royal Northern College of Music
Alumni of Jesus College, Oxford
21st-century pianists
Year of birth missing (living people)
Women classical pianists